HNY may refer to:

 Happy New Year (2014 film)
 Hengyang Nanyue Airport, IATA code HNY
 Hengyang Bajialing Airport, former IATA code HNY
 Hny (trigraph)

See also
 Happy New Year (disambiguation)